Auriat Island is a small island surrounded by Cree Lake, in Northern Saskatchewan, Canada. The island is named after Jean Auriat, a Canadian soldier killed in action on June 7, 1944, during World War II, while attacking a German radar station in Douvres, France.

References

Uninhabited islands of Saskatchewan
Lake islands of Saskatchewan